'The Una Group' is a range of businesses under 3 core areas: commercial property, business services and environmental activities.

The Una Group is based at Airport Business Centre in Plymouth. This was originally home to Stafford Miller and Sensodyne toothpaste. It was developed into a business services & support space in 2004.

The UNA Group was formed by individuals who got together for one business project and found that by working together, other opportunities arose which could be better tackled by the group than by any one individual working alone, hence UNA - Latin for "all together as one". This reflects the Una Group's business philosophy.

Core Areas

The Una Group has commercial property which includes offices and industrial units that are available on various sites across Plymouth. These are: Airport Business Centre, Broadley Park Road, Devonshire Meadows, Devon Enterprise Facility and Eaton Business Park.

The Una Group offers business support including IT, book keeping, HR and health & safety, disaster recovery space, warehousing, logistics and has provided funding support & equity investment to some clients. As an example, UNA is currently supporting a new technology business Imployable, based at ABC, with investment and business support.

The Una Group has previously invested in a rubber processing plant, Crumb Rubber Ltd; which while no longer actively producing, has developed some patents and know-how in both the production of ultra-fine powder and rubber/plastic specialty compounds. Dynaslate Ltd producing slates from recycled rubber and plastic. Another sister venture, CoGen, converts waste wood and other waste streams into electricity and is now looking to deliver a series of waste to energy projects across the country, following successful projects in Plymouth, Merseyside, Birmingham  and Northampton

The Managing Director of The Una Group is David Young who sits on the cross sector leadership group One Plymouth, is Vice Chair of Plymouth Growth Board (where he is on both the Economic Strategy sub group and Digital steering group) and is Chairman of a new CIC business Our Plymouth, that seeks to better match people with time and skills to city wide projects to drive the city forward. He is also Chairman of Imployable.

He has previously been Vice Chairman of Plymouth Chamber of Commerce & Industry an Independent Committee Member of Plymouth College of Art, an Advisory Board Member for Common Purpose UK,  a Trustee of HeartSWell cardiac support charity, and was the Chairman for the Americas Cup Plymouth, Task and Finish Group 2011.
 
The Una Group, is affiliated with following companies: Airport Business Centre, Crumb Rubber, COGEN UK, Back2business, Verneos, Imployable and Plymouth University through their Knowledge Transfer Partnership scheme.

References 

Companies based in Plymouth, Devon